Brodiaea californica, with the common name California brodiaea, is a species of plant in the genus Brodiaea.

The perennial plant, growing from a bulb, is native to California and Oregon.

The flowers, which are borne in late spring or early summer, are variable in colour, ranging from purple to white or occasionally pink.

Etymology

Brodiaea is named for James Brodie [1744-1824], a Scottish botanist who was known for his discovery of Pyrola uniflora in Britain.

Californica means 'from California'.

References

External links

Jepson Manual Treatment: Brodiaea californica
USDA Plants Profile: Brodiaea californica
Brodiaea californica — U.C. Photos gallery

californica
Flora of California
Flora of Oregon
Flora of the Sierra Nevada (United States)
Natural history of the California chaparral and woodlands
Natural history of the California Coast Ranges
Flora without expected TNC conservation status